The Arroyo Simi Overhead is a tall viaduct in Ventura County, California, that carries State Route 118 (SR 118, Ronald Reagan Freeway) over the Arroyo Simi. At the south end of the bridge, the freeway continues as SR 23. The state routes continue as highways to the west and north respectively.

A wetlands was created as a mitigation measure for the impacts of the construction on the Arroyo Simi. Nearby Moorpark College manages and maintains the site which is used as a nature center by the environmental science program.

References

Bridges in Ventura County, California
Road bridges in California
Concrete bridges in California
Viaducts in the United States